This is a list of years in Cambodia. See also the timeline of Cambodian history.

16th century

17th century

18th century

19th century

20th century

21st century

 
Cambodia history-related lists
Cambodia